Millville High School may refer to:

Millville Senior High School in New Jersey
Millville Area Junior Senior High School in Pennsylvania